Senator Wallace may refer to:

Members of the Northern Irish Senate
Martin Kelso Wallace (1898–1978), Northern Irish Senator from 1961 to 1963

Members of the United States Senate
William A. Wallace (1827–1896), U.S. Senator from Pennsylvania from 1875 to 1881

United States state senate members
Bruce A. Wallace (1905–1977), New Jersey State Senate
G. Frank Wallace (1887–1964), New York State Senate
George Wallace (Georgia politician), Georgia State Senate
John M. Wallace (1893–1989), Utah State Senate
Lew Wallace (politician) (1889–1960), Oregon State Senate
Lew Wallace (1827–1905), Indiana State Senate
William Robert Wallace (1886–1960), Oklahoma State Senate